"Bad Man" is a single by musician R. Kelly, included on the soundtrack for the 2000 film Shaft. It was the first and only single from the Shaft soundtrack and charted at number 30 on the R&B/Hip-Hop Singles & Tracks chart. A video for the song was directed by Hype Williams.

Music video
The music video, directed by Hype Williams, features clips from Shaft.

Charts

References

2000 singles
2000 songs
R. Kelly songs
Songs written by R. Kelly
Song recordings produced by R. Kelly
Jive Records singles
Music videos directed by Hype Williams